The Springfield Midgets were a minor league baseball team that played from 1903 to 1904 in the Missouri Valley League and from 1906 to 1909 and 1921 to 1930 in the Western Association. Based in Springfield, Missouri, they were affiliated with the St. Louis Browns in 1930.

Year-by-year record

References

Baseball teams established in 1903
Defunct minor league baseball teams
Sports in Springfield, Missouri
1903 establishments in Missouri
1930 disestablishments in Missouri
Sports clubs disestablished in 1930
Defunct baseball teams in Missouri
Defunct Missouri Valley League teams
Defunct Western Association teams
Baseball teams disestablished in 1930